Eid al-Ghadir is an Islamic commemorative holiday, and is considered to be among the significant holidays of Shi'ite Muslims. The Eid is held on 18 Dhul-Hijjah at the time when the Islamic prophet Muhammad was said to have appointed Ali ibn Abi Talib as his successor. According to Shia hadiths, this Eid has been named "Eid-e Bozorg-e Elāhi" (i.e. the greatest divine Eid), "Eid Ahl al-Bayt Muhammad" and Ashraf al-A'yaad (i.e. the supreme Eid).

Religious background 

Ten years after the migration (Hijrah), the Islamic prophet Muhammad ordered his followers to call upon people everywhere to join him in his first and last pilgrimage. Islamic scholars believe more than seventy thousand people followed Muhammad on his way to Mecca, where, on the fourth day of the month of Dhu'l-Hijjah, there were more than one hundred thousand Muslims present for his entry into the city. While returning from this pilgrimage, on 18 Dhu'l-Hijjah 10 AH (March 632 CE) at an area known as Ghadir Khumm, Muhammad delivered a well-known sermon during which he called up his cousin brother and son-in-law Ali ibn Abi Talib and declared, "to whomsoever I am Mawla, Ali is also their Mawla". While the meaning of the word Mawla can be interpreted in "master", and thus see the sermon as being the official designation of Ali as Muhammad's successor. As a result, the date of the sermon is considered to be one of the foundational events of Shia Islam, with the anniversary becoming one of its most important annual celebrations as "Eid al-Ghadir".

Celebration 

Shia Muslims throughout the world celebrate this event annually with diverse customs. It is held in different countries, including Iran, India, Pakistan, Azerbaijan, Iraq, UAE, Yemen, Afghanistan, Lebanon, Turkey, Bahrain, and Syria. Shia Muslims also celebrate Eid Ghadir in Europe and the Americas, including the U.S., Canada, UK, Germany, France.

In 2022, a 10-km long festival was held in Tehran marking the Ghadir ceremony with hundreds of thousands of the people pouring in Valiasr streets and the nearby streets.

Customs
According to the narrations, Hassan ibn Ali used to hold ceremonies in Kufa on the day of Ghadir. Ali ibn Abitalib used to participate the ceremony accompanied by a group of his followers. After the ceremony, Hassan ibn Ali would give people gifts. Greeting, hand shaking, wearing new cloths, using perfume, making donations, helping others, saying prayers, feeding others, making others happy and giving gifts to others are among the suggested customs reported in narrations. Also people can go to see the customs from shia hhusna alii.

See also

References

External links

Ali
Eid (Islam)
History of Islam
Islamic terminology
Shia days of remembrance
Shia Islam